Chobham Academy is a mixed all-through school and sixth form which opened in September 2013. The school is located on Cheering Lane in the East Village of Stratford in the London Borough of Newham, England. It has 1,800 student places and has a specialism in performing arts and English.

Chobham Academy is located in buildings that were first used during the 2012 Summer Olympics as the main base for organising and managing teams. Rebuilt after the games, it opened in September 2013 as an education campus comprising: a nursery, primary and secondary school, sixth form and adult learning facility.

As a school that was purpose-built to serve the new community established in the former Olympic Village, priority for admission into the school is given to those who live in East Village.

The school is operated by the Harris Federation, a federation of primary and secondary academies in England. The school is sponsored by Lend Lease Group. Lend Lease have been responsible for the design, development and construction of East Village, on behalf of the London Organising Committee of the Olympic and Paralympic Games. The school building was designed by architects Allford Hall Monaghan Morris.

Ofsted inspections

As of 2021, the school's most recent inspection by Ofsted was in 2015, when it was judged Outstanding. This was also the school's first inspection since its establishment.

References

External links

Chobham Academy: The school with an Olympic view (BBC News School Report)

Queen Elizabeth Olympic Park
Stratford, London
Academies in the London Borough of Newham
Primary schools in the London Borough of Newham
Secondary schools in the London Borough of Newham
2013 establishments in England
Educational institutions established in 2013
Harris Federation
Specialist arts colleges in England
Specialist humanities colleges in England